The Unintended is a Canadian indie supergroup, consisting of Dallas Good (died 2022), Travis Good, Sean Dean and Mike Belitsky of The Sadies, Greg Keelor of Blue Rodeo and Rick White of Eric's Trip and Elevator. The band's name comes from a lyric in Gordon Lightfoot's "Go-Go Round." Their music was laid-back psychedelic rock with some folky aspects.

History
The Unintended formed in 2004.  That year the band released an album, "The Unintended", which was recorded by Ian Osborn on Keelor's farm.  It was mastered by Osborn at the Peterborough Arts Umbrella.

In 2006, they released four Gordon Lightfoot covers on the split album Constantines Play Young/Unintended Play Lightfoot.

Discography
2004: The Unintended (Blue Fog/Sonic Unyon)
2006: Constantines Play Young/Unintended Play Lightfoot (Blue Fog)

References

External links
The Unintended on Myspace

Musical groups established in 2004
Musical groups from Toronto
Canadian alternative country groups
Supergroups (music)
2004 establishments in Ontario